Paste is a monthly music and entertainment digital magazine, headquartered in Atlanta, Georgia, with studios in Atlanta and Manhattan, and owned by Paste Media Group. The magazine began as a website in 1998. It ran as a print publication from 2002 to 2010 before converting to online-only.

History
The magazine was founded as a quarterly in July 2002 and was owned by Josh Jackson, Nick Purdy, and Tim Regan-Porter.

In October 2007, the magazine tried the "Radiohead" experiment, offering new and current subscribers the ability to pay what they wanted for a one-year subscription to Paste. The subscriber base increased by 28,000, but Paste president Tim Regan-Porter noted the model was not sustainable; he hoped the new subscribers would renew the following year at the current rates and the increase in web traffic would attract additional subscribers and advertisers.

Amidst an economic downturn, Paste began to suffer from lagging ad revenue, as did other magazine publishers in 2008 and 2009. On May 14, 2009, Paste editors announced a plan to save the magazine, by pleading to its readers, musicians and celebrities for contributions. Cost-cutting by the magazine did not stem the losses. The crux cited for the financial troubles was the lack of advertiser spending.

In 2009, Paste launched an hour-long TV pilot for Halogen TV called Pop Goes the Culture.

On August 31, 2010, Paste suspended the print magazine, but continues publication as the online PasteMagazine.com.

Content
Its tagline is "Signs of Life in Music, Film and Culture". Pastes initial focus was music, covering a variety of genres with an emphasis on adult album alternative, Americana and indie rock, along with independent film and books. Each issue originally included a CD music sampler but was dropped in favor of digital downloading as a Going-Green initiative. Featured artists included Paul McCartney, Ryan Adams, Blackalicious, Regina Spektor, The Whigs, Fiona Apple, The Decemberists, Mark Heard, Woven Hand, Milton and the Devils Party, Liam Finn, The Trolleyvox, and Thom Yorke. Many of these artists also contributed to the Campaign to Save Paste.

References

Further reading

External links
 

2002 establishments in Georgia (U.S. state)
2010 disestablishments in Georgia (U.S. state)
Entertainment magazines published in the United States
Defunct magazines published in the United States
Magazines established in 2002
Magazines disestablished in 2010
Magazines published in Atlanta
Online magazines with defunct print editions
Online music magazines published in the United States
Quarterly magazines published in the United States